Nikolaus Daniel Wachsmann (born 1971) is a professor of modern European history in the Department of History, Classics and Archaeology at Birkbeck College, University of London.

Academic career
Wachsmann was born in Munich. He graduated from the London School of Economics with a Bachelor of Science (BSc) degree, from the University of Cambridge with a taught Master of Philosophy (MPhil) degree, and from the University of London with a Doctor of Philosophy (PhD) degree. His doctoral thesis, which he completed in 2001, was titled "Reform and Repression: Prisons and Penal Policy in Germany, 1918–1939".

In October 1998, Wachsmann began his academic career as a research fellow at Downing College, Cambridge. He was then a lecturer at the University of Sheffield. In 2005, he joined the Department of History, Classics and Archaeology of Birkbeck, University of London.

He is the author of the 2004 book, Hitler's Prisons: Legal Terror in Nazi Germany and the 2015 book KL: A History of the Nazi Concentration Camps.

He is currently writing a new history of Auschwitz.

Personal life 
Wachsmann resides in Liverpool.

Awards and honours
2004 Royal Historical Society Gladstone History Book Prize, winner for Hitler's Prisons: Legal Terror in Nazi Germany
2016 Jewish Quarterly-Wingate Prize, winner for KL: A History of the Nazi Concentration Camps
2016 Mark Lynton History Prize, winner for KL: A History of the Nazi Concentration Camps
2016 Wolfson History Prize, winner for KL: A History of the Nazi Concentration Camps

Selected publications
KL: A History of the Nazi Concentration Camps (New York, London, 2015)
Die Linke im Visier. Zur Errichtung der Konzentrationslager 1933 (Göttingen, 2014), co-edited with Professor Sybille Steinbacher
The Nazi Concentration Camps, 1933-1939: A Documentary History (Lincoln, 2012), co-edited with Dr. Christian Goeschel
Concentration Camps in Nazi Germany: The New Histories (London, 2010), co-edited with Professor Jane Caplan
"Before the Holocaust: New Approaches to the Nazi Concentration Camps, 1933-1939", special issue of Journal of Contemporary History 45 (2010), Nr. 3, co-edited with Dr. Christian Goeschel
Hitler's Prisons: Legal Terror in Nazi Germany (New Haven: Yale University Press, 2004).

References

External links 
KL: A History of the Nazi Concentration Camps by Nikolaus Wachsmann,

1971 births
Living people
Academics of Birkbeck, University of London
Alumni of the London School of Economics
Alumni of the University of Cambridge
Alumni of the University of London
Academics of the University of Sheffield
Historians of Nazism
Historians of the Holocaust
German emigrants to the United Kingdom